"Dancing King" is a song by South Korean comedian Yoo Jae-suk and South Korean–Chinese boy band Exo. The song is a part of SM Station and is a collaboration single for the variety show Infinite Challenge. It was released digitally on September 17, 2016, by SM Entertainment.

Background and release 
On September 12, 2016, it was revealed that the next SM Station single, titled "Dancing King" would feature Yoo Jae-suk and Exo and be released on September 17. It was also revealed that all the profits of the single would be donated. The song has been described as "a dance song based on brass sound and passionate samba rhythm". It was officially released on September 17.

Music video 
The music video was released following which featured Exo. It features shots of the dress rehearsal and the actual performance from Exo Planet 3 – The Exo'rdium concert in Bangkok interspersed with more lighthearted clips of Yoo Jae-suk and EXO members jamming out.

Live performance 
The artists performed the song at the ExoPlanet 3 – The Exo'rdium concert in Bangkok on September 11, 2016, before its release. The performance was aired on episode no. 498 of Infinite Challenge which featured the artists' rehearsal for the song.

Track listing

Commercial performance 
Upon release, "Dancing King" quickly reached the top on seven South Korean online music charts. The song debuted at No. 2 on the South Korean Gaon Digital Chart and on Billboard's US World Digital Songs. The song ranked  No.1 on China's Xiami daily music chart for two days.

Charts

Weekly charts

Monthly charts

Year-end charts

Sales

Awards and nominations

Release history

References 

Exo songs
2016 songs
2016 singles
Korean-language songs
Dance-pop songs
SM Entertainment singles
Songs written by Sermstyle